Apocalypse & Chill is the sixth studio album by the Dutch symphonic metal band Delain. It was released on 7 February 2020 via Napalm Records.

It is the final studio album to feature vocalist Charlotte Wessels, guitarist Timo Somers and bassist Otto Schimmelpenninck van der Oije, as well as the only studio album to feature drummer Joey de Boer on all tracks before his departure with the other members.

Songwriting 
The album focuses on themes such as the climate crisis and the way people react to it, with Martijn Westerholt stating:

Reception   
Writing for Kerrang!, Steve Beebee stated that it was Delain's best album to date and rated it a 4/5.

Metal Injection gave the album an 8/10, stating that "symphonic metal typically sticks to familiar ground—with only marginal variation and experimentation from time to time—and Delain undoubtedly still do it better than most of their peers."

Blabbermouth also gave the album an 8/10, adding that "Delain have upped their game in every department, eschewing cynical acts of musical shark-jumping in favor of aiming for the best and most powerful manifestation of a simple idea."

Track listing

Personnel 
All information from the album booklet.

Delain
 Charlotte Wessels – lead vocals
 Martijn Westerholt – keyboards, backing vocals
 Timo Somers – guitars, co-lead vocals on "One Second", backing vocals
 Otto Schimmelpenninck van der Oije – bass
 Joey de Boer – drums

Guest/session musicians
 Guus Eikens – backing vocals, songwriting
 Yannis Papadopoulos – guest vocals on "Vengeance"
 Shir-Ran Yinon – violin on "Ghost House Heart" and "The Greatest Escape"
 Mikko P. Mustonen – orchestrations

Production
 Martijn Westerholt – songwriting, production, orchestrations
 Charlotte Wessels – songwriting, lyrics
 Timo Somers – songwriting, lyrics
 Jacob Hansen – mixing
 Svante Forsbäck – mastering
 Bas Trumpie – drum engineering
 Imre Beerends – drum engineering
 Tim Tronckoe – band photography
 Maxim Getman – cover art
 Marnix de Klerk – artwork 
 Nina Mathijsen – artwork
 Oliver Phillips – additional arrangements on "To Live Is to Die" and "The Greatest Escape"

Charts

References 

Delain albums
2020 albums
Napalm Records albums